Tokyo Great Bears is the Japanese male volleyball club in V.League Division 1, the highest volleyball league in Japan. Established in May 2022 by Nature Lab Co., Ltd. and would start competing in 2022–23 season.

Concept 
The team name means the players and supporters that are connected, comparable to the seven stars of the Big Dipper, which is part of Ursa Major. The club intend to connect people, regions, and the world through volleyball. They will envision a future that will make the volleyball world more exciting and attractive.

History 
In 2021, it was announced that FC Tokyo volleyball team would suspend the operations after the 2021–22 V. League season. But in May 2022, It was reported that the team was transferred to Nature Lab Co., Ltd. and established as the new team Tokyo Great Bears.

In the same month, Great Bears Co., Ltd. was founded as the management company for the club under Nature Lab and some players from FC Tokyo was also transferred to the club.

All players are offered professional contracts.

Team

Current roster 

{| class="wikitable plainrowheaders collapsible " style="text-align:center" 
! colspan="7"| Team roster – season 2022/2023|-
!style="width:5em; color:white; background-color:#FF1493| 
!style="width:15em; color:white; background-color:#FF1493| Player Name
!style="width:15em; color:white; background-color:#FF1493| Date of birth
!style="width:10em; color:white; background-color:#FF1493| Position
|-
| 1 ||align=left| Hidetomo Hoshino||align=right|||Outside Hitter
|-
| 2 ||align=left| Kentaro Tamaya||align=right||| Setter
|-
| 3 ||align=left| Shohei Nose||align=right|||Libero
|-
| 4 ||align=left| ||align=right||| Opposite Spiker 
|-
| 5 ||align=left| Wataru Taniguchi||align=right||| Outside Hitter 
|-
| 6 ||align=left| Zhang Binglong||align=right|||Outside Hitter
|-
| 7 ||align=left| Kouhei Yanagisawa||align=right|||Outside Hitter
|-
| 8 ||align=left| ||align=right||| Middle Blocker 
|-
| 9 ||align=left| Takahiro Tozaki||align=right|||Outside Hitter
|-
| 10 ||align=left| Taichirō Koga (c)||align=right|||Libero
|-
| 11 ||align=left| Daigo Yamada||align=right|||Middle Blocker
|-
| 12 ||align=left| Hirotaka Odashima||align=right||| Middle Blocker 
|-
| 13 ||align=left| Hayata Yanagimachi||align=right||| Opposite Spiker 
|-
| 17 ||align=left| Shingo Kasari ||align=right|||Outside Hitter
|-
| 18 ||align=left| Tetsuya Muto||align=right||| Middle Blocker 
|-
| 20 ||align=left| Rafael Araújo||align=right|||Opposite Hitter
|-
| 21 ||align=left| Ryosuke Hirata||align=right||| Middle Blocker 
|-
| 26 ||align=left| Ayato Kuroda||align=right||| Outside Hitter
|-
|colspan=4| Head coach:  Koichiro Shimbo
|}

 Head coach history 

Notable Players
 Rafael Araújo  (2022)

 Results 
 League result 
 Champion'''  Runner-up

References

External links 

Japanese volleyball teams
Volleyball clubs established in 2022
2022 establishments in Japan